Edward Purkis Frost (1842 – 1922) was an English pioneer of aviation. He built ornithopters, and became president of the Aeronautical Society.

E.P. Frost lived at West Wratting Hall in Cambridgeshire and became a Justice of the Peace.

Frost began studying flight in 1868 and built a large steam-powered flying machine with both fixed and flapping wings from 1870 to 1877. Frost had intended to have a 20-25 hp steam engine but the actual engine with 5 hp was not powerful enough to lift the ornithopter from the ground. The experiment cost Frost £1000.  In collaboration with several colleagues he started another large similar craft in 1902 with an internal combustion engine. It lifted from the ground in 1904. A wing from this craft is displayed in London's Science Museum.

Frost had been a member of the Aeronautical Society since 1875 and became its president from 1908 to 1911.

References 

English aerospace engineers
Aviation inventors
Aviation pioneers
19th-century aviation
1842 births
1922 deaths
People from West Wratting